Motion is an unincorporated community in Shasta County, California, in the United States.

References

Unincorporated communities in Shasta County, California
Unincorporated communities in California